Paul Pendarvis (né Paul Plumley Pendarvis; 2 December 1907 Enid, Oklahoma – 13 January 1987 Palmdale, California) was an American violinist and big band leader popular in the swing era.

Career 
Pendarvis was born in Enid, Oklahoma.  After completing his junior year (11th grade) at Enid High School in 1924, he transferred to Santa Monica High School, graduating in 1925.  He went on to attend the University of California, Los Angeles.

Pendarvis worked in business and had minor roles in silent films, then moved to Kansas City, Missouri, where he assembled a dance band that quickly found success. Pendarvis's band received radio airplay in the Kansas City area and worked regionally as a territory band in Kansas and the Midwest, including bookings at the Congress Hotel in Chicago. He also booked engagements in New York, and later in the decade moved the band to Los Angeles, playing venues on the California coast. Early in the 1940s he dissolved the group and took a position directing a radio station in California.

Recordings 
Pendarvis recorded for Columbia Records, notably his band's signature song, "My Sweetheart". His vocalists included Marilyn Duke and Phyllis Lynne.

References

Musicians from Oklahoma
1907 births
1987 deaths
American bandleaders
American violinists
20th-century violinists